Félicien Courbet (25 February 1888 – 20 December 1967) was a Belgian water polo player and breaststroke swimmer who competed in the 1908 Summer Olympics, in the 1912 Summer Olympics, and in the 1920 Summer Olympics. He was part of the Belgian water polo team in 1912, which won a bronze medal. In 1908, 1912 and 1920 he also participated in all breaststroke events, but without being able to take part in a final.

See also
 List of Olympic medalists in water polo (men)
 World record progression 200 metres breaststroke

References

External links
 

1888 births
1967 deaths
Belgian male water polo players
Belgian male breaststroke swimmers
Water polo players at the 1912 Summer Olympics
Swimmers at the 1908 Summer Olympics
Swimmers at the 1912 Summer Olympics
Swimmers at the 1920 Summer Olympics
Olympic water polo players of Belgium
Olympic swimmers of Belgium
Olympic bronze medalists for Belgium
World record setters in swimming
Olympic medalists in water polo
Medalists at the 1912 Summer Olympics
Male breaststroke swimmers
20th-century Belgian people